Charles Howard Kline (December 25, 1870 – July 22, 1933) served as the 47th Mayor of Pittsburgh from 1926 to 1933.

Early life
Charles H. Kline was born in 1870 in Indiana County, Pennsylvania. He attended the University of Pennsylvania and became a lawyer in 1898. He married Katherine Whitesell Johnson in 1900.

Kline was elected to the Pennsylvania House of Representatives in 1904, and to the State Senate in 1907. He served three terms in the latter, and was the President pro tempore during the 1915 session. He was a judge in state courts from 1919 to 1925, and was elected Mayor of Pittsburgh in 1926.

Pittsburgh politics
During Kline's administration the city was plunged into the national Great Depression. Despite these newfound hardships, Pittsburgh's corporate community continued to expand, adding several new skyscrapers to the region's horizon.  Among these were the Gulf Oil Tower, Grant Building, and Koppers Tower. Kline is to date the last Republican to be elected Mayor of Pittsburgh.

Mayor Kline expanded the city's borders annexing the neighborhood of Carrick to the city's taxrolls.  His administration ended on a bad note however, Kline was forced to fight charges of malfeasance and political wrongdoing regarding the purchase of an oriental rug.
 
He was indicted on 48 counts of malfeasance, and on conviction in 1932 ordered to resign and sentenced to six months imprisonment.  He died at St. Francis Hospital in Pittsburgh on July 22, 1933. He was buried in Allegheny Cemetery.

See also

 Eliza Kennedy Smith
 List of Mayors of Pittsburgh

References

External links
1933 news article on Mayor Kline

1870 births
1933 deaths
Mayors of Pittsburgh
Republican Party Pennsylvania state senators
Republican Party members of the Pennsylvania House of Representatives
People from Indiana County, Pennsylvania
University of Pennsylvania alumni
Lawyers from Pittsburgh
Burials at Allegheny Cemetery
Pennsylvania politicians convicted of crimes